Williams Ranch is the oldest settlement in Mills County, Texas, now a ghost town, with the oldest known cemetery in the vicinity dating back to the mid-19th century. When originally settled, Williams Ranch was located in the far southern portion of what is now Brown County. (Mills County was formed in 1887.)

History
Around 1855, a John Williams from North Carolina was passing through the area and decided to camp for the night beside a spring on Mullin Creek. Impressed with the location, he bought some land from a fellow whose last name was Williams(W. W. Williams) decided to stay and established a ranch on the springs. The reason the town is called Williams Ranch- because all of John Williams sons had Ranches there.  During the next ten years, a community grew around Williams Ranch consisting of a number of homes, the Florida Hotel (the first in the area before Mills County), a general store, a school (the first public school in the area that would become Mills County), and a number of other businesses including a stage stop. A post office operated in Williams Ranch from 1877 to 1892. It was also the site of the first mill in western Brown County, established near a spring. The reason the town died was out of greed, because the railroad was going to go through there, but the people raised the price of their lands too high, so the railroad bypassed Williams Ranch, Texas. Outlaw John Wesley Hardin met Deputy Sheriff Charles Webb in Williams Ranch about a month before Hardin killed Webb. By the 1880s, the community had about 250 residents. Its demise began when it was bypassed by the Santa Fe Railroad in 1885 but more for the reason of the feud that existed between the town's original settlers and its newcomers.

A petition leading to the legislation that formed Mills County specified Williams Ranch as the county seat.

Today, there is ample evidence of what was once a thriving ranching community including a well-maintained cemetery. The Allen family presently own property adjacent to the cemetery and are local historians.

Geography
Williams Ranch is sited near Mullin Creek, which rises in central Mills County and runs southwest for 12 miles to join on Brown Creek. The settlement served as a stage stop on The Wire Road, a dirt road running from Austin to Fort Phantom Hill near Abilene named for the telegraph line which was the first communication line between Austin and the military outpost. The local terrain is characterized by steep slopes and benches, surfaced by shallow clay loams or sandy soils, which support juniper, live oak, mesquite, and grasses.

Demographics

References

External links
Williams Ranch historical marker entry in the Texas Historic Sites Atlas
Williams Ranch - Texas Ghost Town
Williams Ranch Cemetery listing

Ghost towns in Central Texas
Geography of Mills County, Texas